The president of Angola is both head of state and head of government in Angola. According to the constitution adopted in 2010, the post of prime minister is abolished; executive authority belongs to the president who has also a degree of legislative power, as he can govern by decree. 

The position of president dates from Angola's independence from Portugal. Agostinho Neto obtained the position when his People's Movement for the Liberation of Angola (MPLA) won control of the country from the Portuguese. When Neto died in 1979, José Eduardo dos Santos succeeded him.  

Under Dos Santos' leadership, Angola became a multi-party state, although it remained controlled by him. The election held in 1992 reelected Dos Santos with 49% of the votes. His opponent, Jonas Savimbi of the National Union for Total Independence of Angola (UNITA) party, claimed that the election was fraudulent.

The office of the president is limited to two five-year terms.

The Angolan president is elected by double simultaneous first-past-the-post voting for the same five-year term as the assembly, renewable once. Each participating party nominates a candidate as top of its list, who must be clearly identified on the ballot paper. The top candidate of the party gathering the most votes is elected President in accordance with the 2010 Constitution The new constitution limits a president to serving two terms, although it does not count the terms served to date, and abolishes the post of prime minister, instead introducing the post of vice-president.

João Lourenço is the current incumbent. He ascended to power on 26 September 2017.

List of presidents of Angola (1975–present)

See also
 Vice President of Angola
 Prime Minister of Angola

Relevant lists
General
 Lists of incumbents
 List of national leaders

Angola
 List of colonial governors of Angola
 List of prime ministers of Angola
 List of heads of state of Democratic People's Republic of Angola
 List of heads of government of Democratic People's Republic of Angola

References

Government of Angola
Angola
 
1975 establishments in Angola